Anthony Mwamba (8 August 1960 – 21 January 2021) was a Zambian boxer. He competed in the men's light welterweight event at the 1988 Summer Olympics. Mwamba won a bronze medal in the welterweight (67 kg) division at the 1990 Commonwealth Games. He died of COVID-19 during the pandemic in Zambia.

References

External links
 

1960 births
2021 deaths
Zambian male boxers
Olympic boxers of Zambia
Boxers at the 1988 Summer Olympics
Commonwealth Games medallists in boxing
Commonwealth Games bronze medallists for Zambia
Boxers at the 1990 Commonwealth Games
Deaths from the COVID-19 pandemic in Zambia
Place of birth missing
Light-welterweight boxers
Sportspeople from Lusaka
Medallists at the 1990 Commonwealth Games